On 25 January 2018, a commuter train operated by Trenord derailed in Pioltello when two of its carriages came off the track en route to Milan. The incident left 3 women dead and more than 100 people injured, of whom 46 needed medical assistance in hospital. 5 of them were in critical condition.

Accident 

At about 7:00 local time, a passenger train was travelling from Cremona to Milano Porta Garibaldi when two of the carriages derailed and came to a rest at an angle.
The accident occurred between the Pioltello-Limito station and the Segrate station.

Train operator Trenord say that the train was travelling at normal speed when the derailment occurred. Witnesses say that the train trembled for a few minutes just before the accident.

Investigation 
Italian police began an investigation into the possible cause of the accident and said that a problem with a track switch could be the reason why the derailment occurred. A broken rail on a section of jointed track  from the crash site was later identified as the cause of the derailment. That section of track was scheduled for replacement.

See also
Hither Green rail crash, another derailment caused by a broken rail at a track joint.

References 

2018 in Italy
21st century in Lombardy
Derailments in Italy
January 2018 events in Italy
Railway accidents in 2018
Pioltello